More Great Dirt is the 1989 album from the Nitty Gritty Dirt Band. It is subtitled The Best of The Nitty Gritty Dirt Band, Vol. II, making it a sequel to Twenty Years of Dirt. The songs on this compilation are from albums released from 1984 through 1988. This album reached No. 38 on the US country chart and was certified gold.

Track listing

Personnel
 Jeff Hanna
 Jimmie Fadden
 Jim Ibbotson
 Bob Carpenter

Production
Producers
Marshall Morgan and Paul Worley: Tracks 1, 3, 5, 8 & 10
Josh Leo: Tracks 2, 4, 6, 7 & 9

Chart performance

References
All information from album liner notes unless otherwise noted.

Nitty Gritty Dirt Band albums
1989 compilation albums
Warner Records compilation albums